Olivia Féry (born 27 April 1973) is a French former professional tennis player.

Education
Féry attended University of Arizona. Féry is a graduate if HEC Paris, a private business school.

Career
Féry, who competed under her maiden name Gravereaux, played briefly on the professional tour in the early 1990s, with a best singles ranking of 225 in the world. She reached the final qualifying round of the 1990 French Open women's singles and featured in the main draw of the women's doubles at the 1991 French Open, as a wildcard pairing with Alexandra Fusai. She won singles and doubles bronze medals at the 1993 Summer Universiade, held in the American city of Buffalo. Féry played some college tennis for the Arizona Wildcats of the University of Arizona.

While a resident of Hong Kong, Féry won a national championship in 1998 and represented the Hong Kong Fed Cup team. She appeared in three Fed Cup ties, against Kazakhstan, Japan and Thailand, all in 2000.

Personal life
Her husband is Loïc Féry, a French businessman and the president of football club FC Lorient. They live in London and have three children, Arthur, Albane and Maxime. Eldest son Arthur Fery plays on the ITF junior circuit.

ITF finals

Singles (2–0)

Doubles (0–2)

References

External links
 
 
 

1973 births
Living people
French female tennis players
Hong Kong female tennis players
French expatriates in the United Kingdom
Arizona Wildcats women's tennis players
Universiade medalists in tennis
Universiade bronze medalists for France